Prof David Guwatudde is a Ugandan academic and researcher. He is currently a professor of Epidemiology and Biostatistics in the Department of Epidemiology and Biostatistics at the School of Public Health, Makerere University College of Health Sciences.

Background and education 
He obtained his Msc in social statistics from the University of Southampton, UK, and his PhD from the Case Western Reserve University, Cleveland, Ohio, USA.

Research 
He is a highly experienced researcher whose areas of expertise include epidemiology of hypertension, epidemiology of diabetes, evaluation of effectiveness of interventions for the prevention, management and control of high burden diseases, especially non-communicable diseases, and capacity building through tertiary training. His works have been highly used with 4,361 citations, h-index of 34 and i-10 index of 41. Some of his highly cited works include; Injury patterns in rural and urban Uganda, The state of hypertension care in 44 low-income and middle-income countries: a cross-sectional study of nationally representative individual-level data from 1· 1 million adults, Tuberculosis in household contacts of infectious cases in Kampala, Uganda, The burden of hypertension in sub-Saharan Africa: a four-country cross sectional study, Citywide trauma experience in Kampala, Uganda: a call for intervention, The epidemiology of hypertension in Uganda: findings from the national non-communicable diseases risk factor survey, Prevalence factors associated with hypertension in Rukungiri district, Uganda-a community-based study, Urban malaria: primary caregivers’ knowledge, attitudes, practices and predictors of malaria incidence in a cohort of Ugandan children, Health system performance for people with diabetes in 28 low-and middle-income countries: a cross-sectional study of nationally representative surveys, Diabetes and pre-diabetes among persons aged 35 to 60 years in eastern Uganda: prevalence and associated factors, Mycobacterium africanum Subtype II Is Associated with Two Distinct Genotypes and Is a Major Cause of Human Tuberculosis in Kampala, Uganda, Prevalence and correlates of diabetes mellitus in Uganda: a population‐based national survey, Diabetes diagnosis and care in sub-Saharan Africa: pooled analysis of individual data from 12 countries and Looking at non-communicable diseases in Uganda through a local lens: an analysis using locally derived data.

References 

Year of birth missing (living people)
Living people
21st-century Ugandan people
Ugandan academics
Alumni of the University of Southampton
Case Western Reserve University alumni